Milad Rizk is a Lebanese actor.

Filmography

Television
Takht Sharqi. 2010 (photographer)
Al Arrab Nadi Al Sharq. 2015 (photographer)

Plays
Khabar Agel. 2012

References
http://www.annahar.com/article/233682-ميلاد-رزق-للمسرح-والشاشة
http://bisara7a.com/ماذا-يجمع-بين-ميلاد-رزق-وشربل-اسكندر-ول/
http://www.elfann.com/news/show/1016431/ميلاد-رزق-السياسيين-بيطلبو-منا-ننتقدهم-ببرنامجنا
http://www.elfann.com/news/show/1010123/ميلاد-رزق-للنشرة-يؤسفني-تصل-الـ-LBC-الى-الهاوية
http://www.elfann.com/news/show/1009466/خبر-عاجل-جديد-شربل-اسكندر-وميلاد-رزق-ونخبة-الممثلي
http://www.elfann.com/news/show/1008125/ميلاد-رزق-يتم-اتصال-الـOTV-وانفصال-الـLBC-اوقف-محل
http://www.elfann.com/news/show/1007922/ميلاد-رزق-أنا-أرفض-القيام-بالأدوار-النسائية
http://www.elfann.com/news/show/1007078/خاص-النشرة-آراب-ايدول-يطيح-محل
http://www.elfann.com/news/show/46683/شربل-اسكندر-وميلاد-رزق-يرد-على-التجريح-محل
http://www.elfann.com/news/show/45886/خاص-فريق-اربت-تنحل-يتفكك-شربل-اسكندر-وميلاد-رزق-ين
http://www.imdb.com/name/nm8226382/
http://www.elcinema.com/en/person/1101610

External links

Living people
Lebanese male actors
Lebanese male stage actors
Lebanese male voice actors
Year of birth missing (living people)